Найкраще (The Best) is an album by the winner of the Eurovision Song Contest 2004, Ruslana, released in 2001.

Track listing

Ruslana albums

cs:Diskografie Ruslany#Najkrašče